Barbarano Vicentino is a frazione of the comune of Barbarano Mossano, in the province of Vicenza, Veneto, north-eastern Italy. It is northwest of SP8 provincial road.

Sources
(Google Maps)

References

Cities and towns in Veneto